Josh Levi (born Joshua Levi Bolden, October 7, 1998) is an American singer, actor, and dancer from Houston, Texas. He first gained attention for his role in the NBC television series Friday Night Lights. He then attained further prominence as a finalist on the third season of The X Factor. Afterwards he made guest appearances on the Nickelodeon television shows The Thundermans and Game Shakers.

In 2021, he signed to Issa Rae's Raedio and Atlantic Records. In March 2022, Levi voiced the character of Aaron Z from the fictional boy band 4*Town in the Pixar animated film Turning Red. In April 2022, he earned his first Billboard Hot 100 charting hit with the Billie Eilish and Finneas O'Connell co-written "Nobody Like U" from the film's soundtrack, which peaked at number 49.

Career

2009-2019: Acting, The X Factor and Citizen Four 
Levi started his career with in 2009, when he landed the role of Darius Merriweather on the television series Friday Night Lights, which he starred in for two seasons.

In 2013, he was a finalist on season 3 of the television series The X Factor. After he was eliminated, Levi returned to the show to participate with the top 12 of the competition. Levi then advanced to the final eight slots before he was eliminated for a second time. In February 2014, Levi released his debut single "Trying to Find You". In June 2014, he appeared at a DigiTour show in Dallas, Texas in June. He also performed at the outlets at Anthem tree lighting ceremony in Phoenix, Arizona, and the Citadel Outlets in Los Angeles in November 2014. In 2015, Levi toured with Aaron Carter; and released an official cover of Rihanna, Kanye West, and Paul McCartney's single, "FourFiveSeconds".

In early 2017,  he formed a group named Citizen Four alongside Carson Boatman, Connor Boatman, and fellow The X Factor contestant, Austin Percario for Island Records. In August 2017, it was announced that Levi had left the band. That same year, he made a guest appearance on the Nickelodeon series The Thundermans. In 2018, Levi made another Nickelodeon guest appearance on the television series Game Shakers.

2019-present: Solo music career, college education and record deal 
Following his exit from the group Citizen Four, Levi shifted his full attention towards his education and solo ventures. In July 2019, he earned a Bachelor's degree of science in business and finance from Full Sail University. In July 2020, he released he first extended play DISC ONE. In October 2020, he released the music video for his song "Don't They", which  included a cameo by his childhood friend singer Normani. Celebrity photographer Blair Caldwell directed the music video in his directorial debut.

In September 2021, Levi signed to Issa Rae's Raedio and Atlantic Records. He also released the song "NASA" and its music video. In 2022, Levi voiced the character of Aaron Z from the fictional boy band 4*Town in the Pixar animated film Turning Red. In April 2022, he earned his first Billboard Hot 100 charting hit with the Billie Eilish and Finneas O'Connell co-written "Nobody Like U" from the film's soundtrack, which peaked at number 49. In June 2022, Levi released the remix to his song "Don't They" featuring Normani, from his second extended play DISC TWO.

Filmography

Discography

EPs

Singles 

 2018: 98
 2018: Doorstep
 2018: Drive By
 2019: Seen It All
 2020: If The World
 2021: NASA
 2021: What's The Use (with Raedio)
 2022: VICES
 2022: Don't They [Remix] (feat. Normani)

References

1998 births
Living people
21st-century African-American male singers
21st-century American male actors
American male pop singers
American male television actors
Male actors from Houston
The X Factor (American TV series) contestants
21st-century American male singers
21st-century American singers